The Cook County Board of Commissioners is a legislative body made up of 17 commissioners who are elected by district, and a president who is elected county-wide, all for four-year terms. Cook County, which includes the City of Chicago, is the United States' second-largest county with a population of 5.2 million residents. The county board sets policy and laws for the county regarding property, public health services, public safety, and maintenance of county highways. It is presided over by its president, currently Toni Preckwinkle.

The commissioners, president, and county clerk (who serves as clerk of the board), hold the same offices ex officio on the separate governmental taxing body, the Cook County Forest Preserve District Board of Commissioners.

History 

Until 1870, Cook County had been governed under the "township supervisor" system, under which each Chicago ward elected a supervisor, and each township elected one or more as well depending on population, creating a board of 50 members, less than half from Chicago. In the wake of a scandal involving then board chairman J. J. Kearney (who was eventually unseated and expelled from the board), the new commission was created pursuant to an amendment to the state constitution, initially with ten Chicago commissioners elected from groups of wards within the city, and five members elected from groups of townships outside the city, presided over by a chairman elected by the board from among their own number. The commissioners were elected for three-year terms, on a staggered basis. The first meeting of the new board took place December 4, 1871; they elected businessman and Civil War general Julius White of Evanston as their chairman.

Elections
The board's seventeen commissioners are elected from individual constituencies for four year terms, with elections for all constituencies held during United States midterm elections. Its president is elected at-large to a four-year term in elections held during United States midterm elections.

Prior to 1990, commissioners were elected through two sets of elections, one held in Chicago to elect ten commissioners and another held in suburban Cook County to elect the remaining seven commissioners. In 1994, the board switched to having commissioners elected from individual constituencies.

Commissioners

Current
This is a list of the Cook County Commissioners in order by district. This list is current as of December 2022.

Past

Before 1994
Individuals who, before 1994, served as president of the Cook County Board of Commissioners included J. Frank Aldrich, Edward J. Brundage, Anton Cermak, George Dunne, Richard B. Ogilvie, Richard Phelan, Dan Ryan Jr. Charles C. P. Holden, and Seymour Simon. The first county board chairman (a role which preceded the creation of the president position) was Julius White.

Individuals who served as commissioners before the move to individual constituencies in 1994 included Charles Bernardini, George Marquis Bogue, Charles S. Bonk, Jerry Butler, Allan C. Carr, Carl R. Chindblom, John P. Daley, Danny K. Davis, Oscar Stanton De Priest, Marco Domico, Martin Emerich, Carter Harrison Sr., John Humphrey, John Jones, Walter J. LaBuy, Ted Lechowicz, Maria Pappas, Lillian Piotrowski, Herb Schumann, Harry H. Semrow, Francis Cornwall Sherman, Seymour Simon, Horace M. Singer, Bobbie L. Steele, Alanson Sweet, William Hale Thompson, and Jill Zwick.

Since 1994

See also 
 Cook County Board of Review
 Chicago City Council

References

External links 
 Cook County official government website
 Commissioners & Elected Officials
 Secretary to the Board: Past Cook County Board Presidents
 Collection of news and information about the Cook County Board from the Chicago Tribune.